Llanfihangel Glyn Myfyr is a village and community in Conwy County Borough, in Wales. At the 2001 census the community had a population of 195, reducing to 189 at the 2011 census.

The old farmhouse at Bodtegir, south east of the village, built in 1655 by William Salesbury, the Royalist governor of Denbigh Castle during the English Civil War, is Grade II* listed, as is Saint Michael's Church.  Pont Llyn Gigfran, which carries a minor road to Betws Gwerfil Goch over the Afon Alwen, in the south east of the community, is Grade II listed.

The antiquary Owen Jones, who compiled The Myvyrian Archaiology of Wales, published between 1801 and 1807, was born in the community.  He died in 1814 and was buried in London, but his gravestone was removed to Llanfihangel Glyn Myfyr after the churchyard at All-Hallows-the-Less was damaged by bombing in World War II.

References

External links 

 A Vision of Britain Through Time
 British Listed Buildings
 Clwyd Churches
 Eastern Conwy Churches Survey
 Genuki
 Geograph
 Office for National Statistics

Villages in Conwy County Borough
Communities in Conwy County Borough